1987 Kaplan, provisional designation , is a stony Phocaea asteroid from the inner regions of the asteroid belt, approximately 14 kilometers in diameter. It was discovered on 11 September 1952, by Russian astronomer Pelageya Shajn at the Simeiz Observatory on the Crimean peninsula. The asteroid was named after Russian astrophysicist Samuil Kaplan.

Orbit and classification 

Kaplan is a member of the Phocaea family, a large family of stony asteroids with nearly two thousand known members.

It orbits the Sun in the inner main belt at a distance of 1.8–2.9 AU once every 3 years and 8 months (1,343 days). Its orbit has an eccentricity of 0.23 and an inclination of 24° with respect to the ecliptic. The body's observation arc begins with its official discovery observation at Simeiz in September 1952.

Physical characteristics 

Kaplan is an assumed S-type asteroid, in agreement with the overall spectral type of the Phocaea family.

Rotation period 

Between 2000 and 2011, three rotational lightcurves of Kaplan were obtained from photometric observations by astronomer Brian Warner at his Palmer Divide Observatory in Colorado, United States. Lightcurve analysis gave a well-defined rotation period between 9.453 and 9.49 hours with a brightness amplitude from 0.46 to 0.65 magnitude.

Poles 

In addition a modeled lightcurve, using photometric data from various sources, gave a concurring period of 9.45950 hours and determined two spin axis of (356.0°, −58.0°) and (233.0°, −89.0°) in ecliptic coordinates.

Diameter and albedo 

According to the surveys carried out by the Japanese Akari satellite and the NEOWISE mission of NASA's Wide-field Infrared Survey Explorer, Kaplan measures between 11.70 and 14.606 kilometers in diameter and its surface has an albedo between 0.2094 and 0.28.

The Collaborative Asteroid Lightcurve Link assumes an albedo of 0.23 – derived from 25 Phocaea, the family's parent body and namesake, and calculates a diameter of 13.89 kilometers based on an absolute magnitude of 11.5.

Naming 

This minor planet was named after Samuil Kaplan (1921–1978), Soviet astronomer and astrophysicist at Lvov University Observatory, Ukraine, and at the Radiophysical Research Institute in Nizhny Novgorod (formerly known as Gorky), Russia. His research included a variety of astrophysical fields, such as white dwarfs, interstellar matter, radiative transfer, solar radiation, pulsars and galactic nuclei.

The official naming citation was published by the Minor Planet Center on 1 June 1980.

Notes

References

External links 
 Asteroid Lightcurve Database (LCDB), query form (info )
 Dictionary of Minor Planet Names, Google books
 Asteroids and comets rotation curves, CdR – Observatoire de Genève, Raoul Behrend
 Discovery Circumstances: Numbered Minor Planets (1)-(5000) – Minor Planet Center
 
 

001987
Discoveries by Pelageya Shajn
Named minor planets
19520911